Halston is a 2021 American biographical drama streaming television miniseries based on the life of designer Halston, starring Ewan McGregor. Adapted from the 1991 book Simply Halston by Steven Gaines, the series was ordered by Netflix in September 2019 and premiered on May 14, 2021.

Cast and characters

Main
 Ewan McGregor as Halston
 Rebecca Dayan as Elsa Peretti
 David Pittu as Joe Eula
 Krysta Rodriguez as Liza Minnelli
 Bill Pullman as David J. Mahoney

Supporting
 Rory Culkin as Joel Schumacher
 James Riordan as Henry Bisset
 Sullivan Jones as Ed Austin
 Kelly Bishop as Eleanor Lambert
 Gian Franco Rodriguez as Victor Hugo
 Dilone as Pat Cleveland
 Vera Farmiga as Adele
 James Waterston as Mike
 Jason Kravits as Carl Epstein
 Mary Beth Peil as Martha Graham
 Maxim Swinton as Young Roy Halston
 Sietzka Rose as Karen Bjornson
Jack Mikesell as John David Ridge
Shannan Wilson as Bobbi Mahoney

Episodes

Production

Development
In January 2019, it was announced that Legendary Television and Killer Films had put in development Simply Halston, a miniseries based on the life of Halston that would be based on the book of the same name by Steven Gaines, with Ewan McGregor set to star as Halston and the series to be written by Sharr White and directed by Daniel Minahan.

In September 2019, Ryan Murphy revealed to Time that he had signed onto Halston as an executive producer and that the series had been ordered by Netflix under his overall deal at the company. The series premiered on May 14, 2021.

Casting
On February 18, 2020, Murphy announced on a since deleted Instagram post that in addition to McGregor starring, other cast members of Halston included Krysta Rodriguez as Liza Minnelli, Rory Culkin as Joel Schumacher, Rebecca Dayan as Elsa Peretti, Sullivan Jones as Ed Austin, David Pittu as Joe Eula, Gian Franco Rodriguez as Victor Hugo, and Maxim Swinton as Young Roy Halston.

Reception
For the limited series, review aggregator Rotten Tomatoes reported an approval rating of 67% based on 54 critic reviews, with an average rating of 6.30/10. The website's critics consensus reads, "Ewan McGregor brings megawatt charisma to match Halston vibrant recreation of a fashion era, but the series' glib treatment of the legendary designer's interior life yields a lot of style with little substance." Metacritic gave the series a weighted average score of 50 out of 100 based on 20 critic reviews, indicating "mixed or average reviews".

Accolades

References

External links 
 
 

2020s American drama television miniseries
2020s American LGBT-related drama television series
2021 American television series debuts
2021 American television series endings
American biographical series
Cultural depictions of fashion designers
English-language Netflix original programming
Fashion-themed television series
Gay-related television shows
Television series set in the 1960s
Television series set in the 1970s
Television series set in the 1980s
Television shows based on books
Television shows set in New York City
Works by Ryan Murphy (writer)